Taghachar, also spelled Tajir, Ta'achar (died c. 1296) was a commander in the army of the Mongol Empire. He was one of the conspirators involved in the overthrow of three Ilkhanate khans, and placed the short-lived Baydu on the throne in 1295.

Background 
Taghachar was a member of the Suquai'ud branch of the Baarin tribe. His father was Qutu Buqa, a tümen commander operated under Hulagu and Abaqa and died in battle against Golden Horde. He also had an elder brother called Taiju, who died in infancy. His other relatives, including his grandfather Temüge Noyan who was emir and uncle Jangqun who was head of security force looking after security of roads were all important emirs of Mongol armies. When Hulegu entered Persia in 1256, Taghachar commanded a battalion of his western wing. He was mainly stationed in province of Fars.

Career under Abaqa and Tekuder 
His main rise to prominence began after Battle on Ağsu banks against Golden Horde on 19–20 July 1265. Although Prince Yoshmut's army defeated Nogai, his father Qutu Buqa died in this battle. Just like Buqa, as an orphaned person whose father died in battle he was given great importance and care by Abaqa, later he became his inaq - a trusted follower and a member of keshig. As new position as vizier Majd al-Mulk Yazdi's overseer, he imprisoned Ata-Malik Juvayni on behalf of Abaqa in 1281, accusing him of embezzling the treasure - a charge that was brought by Majd al-Mulk. Soon after Abaqa's death in 1281, Taghachar was among the commanders who appeared on Tekuder's election with new ilkhan's mother Qutui Khatun. Nevertheless, he supported Arghun later, who believed Juvayni brothers were responsible for his father's death by poisoning. Tekuder seeing Arghun as a strong rival, he seized Taghachar among other emirs who supported Arghun and kept imprisoned in Tabriz. He was released after Tekuder's arrest on 26 July 1284 and became one of the prominent emirs under Arghun.

Under Arghun 
Arghun rewarded Taghachar by making him a commander of Qara'unas and appointing him as atabeg of his youngest son Khitai-Oghul. Taghachar soon took action against Buqa in 1289, who harnessed absolute power in his hands. Arghun's first step was to investigate former non-paid Salghurid taxes. As a result, he appointed Taghachar to as new head of Fars province inju treasury and gained over 1.5 million dinars from the province. After Buqa's death, his associates including Georgian king Demetre II were executed. His 16-year-old son, David was put in Taghachar's household. Taghachar's status was so strengthened that he became of the recipients of letters from Nicholas IV as person of power.

In 1290, he participated in Arghun's army in battles against Golden Horde khan Mengu Timur on Caucasus. Moving from capital on 28 March, he arrived on banks of Karasu river (on north of the Derbent) and was victorious against Mengu Timur's commander Toqay Noyan and Terktay Bahadur. Following the victory, Taghachar was sent to Khorasan front in April. Towards the end of Arghun's reign, Taghachar allied himself to other powerful emirs like Tugel, Toghan and Qoncuqbal in order to remove powerful vizier Sa'ad al-Dawla in 1291. Arghun was seriously ill and apparently couldn't speak, which gave Taghachar his allies the opportunity of removing their rivals in court, starting with Sa'ad al-Dawla. He invited the Arghun's senior emirs Orduqiya, Josh, and Qujan to a feast in honor of his ward Khitay's birthday on 4 March, where they were arrested. Sa'ad al-Dawla was found in suburban Tabriz and was executed in Taghachar's house next day.

Under Gaykhatu 
After death of Arghun, Taghachar and his allies supported Baydu, feeling the candidate Gaykhatu would replace them with his subordinates in Anatolia, lying him that Baydu was already taken the throne. Suspicious Gaykhatu tortured envoy to learn truth and sent 10.000 men ahead upon learning it, while himself moved to Arran and Azerbaijan. In any case, Baydu refused the throne. Gaykhatu took Taghachar's tumen and gave it to Shiktur Noyan of Jalairs in 1291. However, he could stay much in capital and had to leave for Anatolia hearing news of Turcoman rebellion, appointing Shiktur Noyan as regent of the state while confirming Prince Anbarchi (son of Möngke Temür) as viceroy of East stationed in Ray. His absence in Iran was followed by a conspiracy led by Taghachar and his follower Sa'ad al-Din Zanjani. They falsely informed viceroy Anbarchi - via Sad al-Din's brother Qutb al-Din, who was Anbarchi's vizier - of Gaykhatu's defeat by Turcomans in Anatolia and called him to take the throne. While ambitious, Anbarchi regarded this news with suspicion. After contacting Shiktur Noyan who was residing near Karachal, Anbarchi had them imprisoned by Shiktur. Taghachar was only pardoned by Gaykhatu in 1292, even appointing Sa'ad al-Din Zanjani to the post of vizier on 18 November 1292 and his ward  David as king of Georgia.

After his release, Taghachar continued to serve Gaykhatu. He was mentioned by Rashid al-Din as Gaykhatu's second-in-command in June 1292 in Syria and an enforcer of Jiaochao in Tabriz. Seeing growing resentment against Gaykhatu, Taghachar changed his allegiance secretly to Baydu again. When Gaykhatu sent Taghachar against Baydu on 17 March 1295, he changed sides openly and led Baydu's armies against Gaykhatu, finally placing former on the throne on 24 March 1295.

Under Baydu 
Being a kingmaker of Baydu, Taghachar achieved viceroyalty of Anatolia and Diyar Bakr in 1295. However, seeing advances of Nawruz against Baydu and his protege Sa'ad al-Din Zanjani's loss of vizierate, he against changed sides and joined Ghazan. A civil war ensued, led by Ghazan Khan, who executed Baydu on the 5 October 1295.

Under Ghazan 
Ghazan confirmed Taghachar as viceroy in Rûm on 9 December because he had concerns over his continued loyalty and thought it safer to keep him at a distance. Meanwhile, Nawruz became naib of Ilkhanate and headed Ghazan's army against Chagatai khan Duwa's invasion of Khorasan in 1295. However, Ilkhanid prince Sogai (son of Yoshmut) refused to join campaign in Khorasan, believing this was Nawruz's plot further deprive nobility of their possessions. Taghachar was thought to have been implicated in the rebellion of Prince Sogai and was declared a rebel. Taghachar strengthened himself in Tokat and resisted against Ghazan's commanders Harmanji, Baltu and Arap (son of Samagar). He was soon arrested by Baltu near Delice and was delivered to Ghazan in 1296.

Shortly afterwards Ghazan reluctantly ordered the murder of Taghachar; he recognised that he had been a help and that he was not an imminent threat, and explained his decision by reference to Chinese story about execution of a commander who saved a future emperor by betraying a former one.

Family 
It is not known to whom Taghachar was married but he had at least two sons: Mubarak and Jaruq. Mubarak died in his youth but apparently Jaruq was alive during reigns of Ghazan and Öljaitü. According to Kazakh researcher Jaqsylyq Sabitov, Jaruq may have fled to Golden Horde where he married a daughter of Mengu Timur and fathered Golden Horde emirs Muhammad Khwaja, Saray-Timur and Kutluk-Timur (d.1336).

Notes

References
 Atwood, Christopher P. (2004). The Encyclopedia of Mongolia and the Mongol Empire. Facts on File, Inc. .

Generals of the Ilkhanate
1296 deaths
Year of birth unknown
Generals of the Mongol Empire